The Palliser Range is a mountain range of the Canadian Rockies that lies in the extreme southeast corner of Banff National Park, Alberta, Canada.

The Palliser Range is part of the East Banff Ranges of the Central Front Canadian Rockies.

Lake Minnewanka marks the southern boundary of the range while the Bare Range marks the northern boundary. Its eastern reaches are marked by the Blackrock Mountain of the Ghost River Area. The range was named by the Palliser expedition as it appears on one of the maps produced by the expedition. The range gives the name to the Palliser Formation, a stratigraphical unit prominently featured in the mountains of this range.

This range includes the following mountains and peaks:

See also
Ranges of the Canadian Rockies

References

Mountain ranges of Alberta
Ranges of the Canadian Rockies
Mountains of Banff National Park